Jikradia is a genus of leafhoppers (family Cicadellidae). There are over 20 described species in Jikradia.

Species

 Jikradia bahamensis Nielson, 1979
 Jikradia basipendula Nielson, 1979
 Jikradia bispinosa Nielson, 1979
 Jikradia cornicula Nielson, 1979
 Jikradia costaricensis Nielson, 1979
 Jikradia dentata Nielson & Zack, 2014
 Jikradia exilis Nielson & Zack, 2014
 Jikradia floridana (Lawson, 1927)
 Jikradia galapagoensis (Osborn, 1924)
 Jikradia infula Nielson, 1989
 Jikradia krameri Nielson, 1979
 Jikradia lizanoi Godoy & Nielson, 1998
 Jikradia longa Godoy & Nielson, 1998
 Jikradia melanotus (Spångberg, 1878)
 Jikradia mexicana Godoy & Nielson, 1998
 Jikradia olitoria (Say, 1830)
 Jikradia serrata Nielson, 1979
 Jikradia trispinata Nielson & Zack, 2014
 Jikradia uniseta Nielson, 1979
 Jikradia variabilis Nielson & Zack, 2014
 Jikradia zurquiensis Godoy & Nielson, 1998

References

External links

 

Cicadellidae
Hemiptera genera